John Galbraith (August 2, 1794 – June 15, 1860) was a three term Jacksonian and Democratic member of the U.S. House of Representatives from Pennsylvania.

Early life and career
John Galbraith was born in Huntingdon, Pennsylvania.  He moved with his parents in 1796 to Allegheny Township, in Huntingdon County, and subsequently, in 1802, to Centre Township, in Butler County.  He attended the common schools and served an apprenticeship at the printer's trade.

He taught school, studied law, was admitted to the bar in 1817 and commenced practice in Butler, Pennsylvania.  He moved to Franklin, Pennsylvania, in 1822 and continued the practice of his profession.

Political career
He was a member of the Pennsylvania House of Representatives from 1829 to 1832.

Galbraith was elected as a Jacksonian to the Twenty-third and Twenty-fourth Congresses.  He was an unsuccessful candidate for renomination in 1836.  He moved to Erie, Pennsylvania, in 1837, and resumed the practice of law.  He was again elected as a Democrat to the Twenty-sixth Congress.  He was not a candidate for renomination in 1840.

Later career and death
He again engaged in the practice of law, and was elected president judge of the sixth judicial district in 1851 and served until his death in Erie in 1860.

He is buried in Erie Cemetery.

References

 The Political Graveyard

1794 births
1860 deaths
People from Huntingdon, Pennsylvania
Democratic Party members of the Pennsylvania House of Representatives
Pennsylvania lawyers
Democratic Party members of the United States House of Representatives from Pennsylvania
Politicians from Erie, Pennsylvania
Jacksonian members of the United States House of Representatives from Pennsylvania
19th-century American politicians
Burials in Pennsylvania